Klakegg is a Norwegian surname. Notable people with the surname include:

 Bjørn Klakegg (born 1958), Norwegian jazz guitarist and composer
 Rune Klakegg (born 1955), Norwegian jazz pianist and composer

Norwegian-language surnames